Chikusichloa is a genus of Asian plants in the grass family.

 Species
 Chikusichloa aquatica Koidz. - Jiangsu, Honshu, Kyushu
 Chikusichloa brachyathera Ohwi - Nansei-shoto
 Chikusichloa mutica Keng - Guangdong, Guangxi, Hainan, Sumatra

See also 
 List of Poaceae genera

References

Poaceae genera
Oryzoideae